Atlalilco is a station along Line 8 and Line 12 of the metro of Mexico City. Atlalilco is a transfer station between the Line 12 and Line 8. Line 8 station is located on the Calzada Ermita Iztapalapa, while Line 12 station is located on Avenida Tláhuac, in the Colonia Santa Isabel Industrial neighbourhood.

The station's logo is a well of water. Atlalilco in Nahuatl means: "where water is kept". It opened for service along Line 8 on 20 July 1994. The interstation tunnel runs underground through Calzada Ermita Iztapalapa and Avenida Tlahuac, with an additional access to the station at the intersection of both avenues. It is the only station that has mechanical bands to assist in the interstation walk.

Ridership

References

External links 
 

Atlalilco
Mexico City Metro stations in Iztapalapa
Railway stations opened in 1994
1994 establishments in Mexico
2012 establishments in Mexico
Railway stations opened in 2012
Mexico City Metro Line 12 stations
Accessible Mexico City Metro stations